Schriro v. Summerlin, 542 U.S. 348 (2004), was a case in which the United States Supreme Court held that a requirement that a different Supreme Court decision requiring the jury rather than the judge to find aggravating factors would not be applied retroactively.

Facts
In April 1981, Warren Wesley Summerlin killed a creditor who had come to his home in Phoenix, Arizona, to inquire about a debt.  He was later convicted of first-degree murder and received a death sentence.  Under Arizona law at the time, a jury decided the question of guilt but a judge sitting without a jury decided the question of penalty after receiving evidence regarding aggravating and mitigating factors.  The Arizona Supreme Court affirmed the death sentence.  While the appeal in his habeas corpus case was pending in the Ninth Circuit, the Supreme Court decided Ring v. Arizona, which held that such aggravating factors had to be proved to a jury rather than a judge. The Ninth Circuit ruled that the Ring decision applied to Summerlin's case even though Ring was decided after Summerlin's conviction had become final on direct review. The state appealed this decision to the Supreme Court.

Result
The Court, in an opinion by Justice Scalia, reversed the decision of the Ninth Circuit Court of Appeals, and stated that "we give retroactive effect to only a small set of 'watershed rules of criminal procedure implementing the fundamental fairness and accuracy of the criminal proceeding.' That a new procedural rule is 'fundamental' in some abstract sense is not enough; the rule must be one 'without which the likelihood of an accurate conviction is seriously diminished."

See also
List of United States Supreme Court cases, volume 542
List of United States Supreme Court cases

References

Further reading

External links
 

United States Supreme Court cases
United States Supreme Court cases of the Rehnquist Court
Cruel and Unusual Punishment Clause and death penalty case law
Capital punishment in Arizona
2004 in United States case law
United States Sixth Amendment sentencing case law